Alessandro Faedo (18 November 1913 – 15 June 2001) (also known as Alessandro Carlo Faedo or Sandro Faedo) was an Italian mathematician and politician, born in Chiampo. He is known for his work in numerical analysis, leading to the Faedo–Galerkin method: he was one of the pupils of Leonida Tonelli and, after his death, he succeeded him on the chair of mathematical analysis at the University of Pisa, becoming dean of the faculty of sciences and then rector and exerting a strong positive influence on the development of the university.

Selected publications

Scientific works
.
.
.

Historical, commemorative and survey works
. "Leonida Tonelli and the Pisa mathematical school" (English translation of the title) is a survey of the work of Tonelli in Pisa and his influence on the development of the school, presented at the International congress in occasion of the celebration of the centenary of birth of Mauro Picone and Leonida Tonelli (held in Rome on 6–9 May 1985).
, is a brief commemorative historical paper describing the events which led Ennio De Giorgi to hold a chair at the Scuola Normale Superiore.

See also
Calculus of variation
Fichera's existence principle
Variational method
Ritz method

Notes

References

Biographical and general references
.
. The presidents: Alessandro Faedo (English translation of title) is a brief biographical chapter on Alessandro Faedo published in the book celebrating the first 90th years of the CNR.
. A short commemoration of Alessandro Faedo written by Giorgio Letta for the Notiziario UMI and published online on the old web site of the Unione Matematica Italiana, preserved in its original form by the Internet Archive, but also available here from the University Library Service of the University of Pisa.
. The inaugural address given by Mario Miranda during the official 2005 meeting of the Istituto Veneto di Scienze, Lettere ed Arti.
 is a short obituary notice published few months after the death of Alessandro Faedo.
. "Alessandro Faedo. A leading mathematician and innovator of Italian University" (English translation of the title) is a short commemoration of Alessandro Faedo, cured by the editorial board of the "Architetture Pisane" architecture journal. It was published in a special issue on the Collegio Faedo, the university college named after him in Pisa, and reissued in book form.
. A commemorative paper focusing mainly on Faedo's results in mathematics, while sketching only briefly his work as a research organizer and as a teacher.
. "The four seasons of Pisan scientists" a paper describing the historical development of the scientific faculties at the University of Pisa.

Scientific references
.

Publications and conferences and dedicated to Alessandro Faedo
 (e–).

External links

1913 births
2001 deaths
People from Vicenza
20th-century Italian mathematicians
Christian Democracy (Italy) politicians
20th-century Italian politicians
University of Pisa alumni
Academic staff of the University of Pisa
Numerical analysts
Mathematical analysts